Andrew McLardy (born 20 January 1974) is a South African professional golfer.

McLardy was born in Triangle, Zimbabwe to Scottish parents. He had a successful amateur career, including representing South Africa twice in the Eisenhower Trophy, before turning professional in 1997. He joined the Southern Africa Tour, now the Sunshine Tour, where he has accumulated five wins.

In 1998, McLardy qualified for the European Tour via qualifying school. He finished inside the top 100 on the Order of Merit in both his first two seasons, before he moved to the United States to try his hand at the PGA Tour. He finished tied for fifth at the PGA Tour Qualifying Tournament in December 2000, to earn a card for the 2001 season. However, he was largely unsuccessful during his rookie season, and spent 2002 and 2003 on the second tier Nationwide Tour.

McLardy returned to Europe in 2004, regaining full playing status on the European Tour for 2005 through qualifying school. He finished every season from 2005 to 2009 inside the top 110 on the Order of Merit, with a career high ranking of 62nd in 2007.

Professional wins (5)

Sunshine Tour wins (5)

Results in major championships

Note: McLardy never played in the Masters Tournament or the PGA Championship.

"T" = tied

Results in World Golf Championships

"T" = Tied

Team appearances
Eisenhower Trophy (representing South Africa): 1994, 1996

See also
2000 PGA Tour Qualifying School graduates
2009 PGA Tour Qualifying School graduates

External links

South African male golfers
Sunshine Tour golfers
European Tour golfers
PGA Tour golfers
1974 births
Living people